USS Neptune was a large steamer, with powerful guns and a large crew, acquired by the United States Navy for service with the Union Navy during the American Civil War. She served the Navy primarily, as an armed escort vessel in the West Indies for Union Navy and commercial ships traveling through that area on their way to and from California.

Acquisition and commissioning 

Neptune, a wooden steamer, was purchased by the U.S. Navy at New York City on 17 July 1863 from William P. Williamson of the Neptune Steamship Company. She was delivered to the United States Government at the New York Navy Yard in Brooklyn, New York, on 3 September 1863, and was commissioned there on 19 December 1863.

Service history 

Assigned to the West India Squadron, Neptune departed New York City on 9 January 1864 and operated principally in convoying steamers bound for California through the West Indies. At the end of the American Civil War in 1865, she returned to New York City, where she was decommissioned on 31 May 1865.

Fate 
Neptune was sold at auction at New York City on 12 July 1865 to John Henderson. She operated briefly in commercial service before being stranded in fog off Long Island, New York, on 5 December 1865.

See also

 Confederate States Navy

References 

Ships of the Union Navy
Steamships of the United States Navy
Gunboats of the United States Navy
Maritime incidents in December 1865
Shipwrecks of the New York (state) coast